Gigi Fernández and Natasha Zvereva successfully defended their title, defeating Jana Novotná and Arantxa Sánchez Vicario in the final, 6–4, 6–1 to win the ladies' doubles tennis title at the 1994 Wimbledon Championships.

Seeds

  Gigi Fernández /  Natasha Zvereva (champions)
  Jana Novotná /  Arantxa Sánchez Vicario (final)
  Patty Fendick /  Meredith McGrath (third round)
  Manon Bollegraf /  Martina Navratilova (semifinals)
  Pam Shriver /  Elizabeth Smylie (quarterfinals)
  Katrina Adams /  Helena Suková (second round)
  Natalia Medvedeva /  Larisa Neiland (quarterfinals)
  Amanda Coetzer /  Inés Gorrochategui (withdrew)
  Lindsay Davenport /  Lisa Raymond (third round)
  Mary Joe Fernández /  Zina Garrison (first round)
  Lori McNeil /  Rennae Stubbs (third round)
  Julie Halard-Decugis /  Nathalie Tauziat (third round)
  Yayuk Basuki /  Nana Miyagi (third round)
  Sandra Cecchini /  Patricia Tarabini (second round)
  Jill Hetherington /  Shaun Stafford (second round)
  Laura Golarsa /  Caroline Vis (third round)

Qualifying

Draw

Finals

Top half

Section 1

Section 2

Bottom half

Section 3

Section 4

References

External links

1994 Wimbledon Championships on WTAtennis.com
1994 Wimbledon Championships – Women's draws and results at the International Tennis Federation

Women's Doubles
Wimbledon Championship by year – Women's doubles
Wimbledon Championships